Crouching Tiger, Hidden Dragon is a 2000 wuxia martial arts adventure film directed by Ang Lee and written for the screen by Wang Hui-ling, James Schamus, and Tsai Kuo-jung. The film stars Chow Yun-fat, Michelle Yeoh, Zhang Ziyi, and Chang Chen. It is based on the Chinese novel of the same name serialized between 1941 and 1942 by Wang Dulu, the fourth part of his Crane Iron pentalogy.

A multinational venture, the film was made on a US$17 million budget, and was produced by Edko Films and Zoom Hunt Productions in collaboration with China Film Co-productions Corporation and Asian Union Film & Entertainment for Columbia Pictures Film Production Asia in association with Good Machine International. With dialogue in Standard Chinese, subtitled for various markets, Crouching Tiger, Hidden Dragon became a surprise international success, grossing $213.5 million worldwide. It grossed US$128 million in the United States, becoming the highest-grossing foreign-language film produced overseas in American history. The film was the first foreign-language film to break the $100 million mark in the United States.

The film premiered at the Cannes Film Festival on 18 May 2000, and was theatrically released in the United States on 8 December. Receiving universal acclaim and a box office hit, Crouching Tiger, Hidden Dragon won over 40 awards and was nominated for 10 Academy Awards in 2001, including Best Picture, and won Best Foreign Language Film, Best Art Direction, Best Original Score, and Best Cinematography, receiving the most nominations ever for a non-English-language film at the time, until 2018's Roma tied this record. The film also won four BAFTAs and two Golden Globe Awards, one for Best Foreign Film. Along with its numerous awards, Crouching Tiger is often cited as one of the finest wuxia films ever made. The film has been praised for its story, direction, cinematography, and martial arts sequences.

Plot 
In the Qing dynasty China, Li Mu Bai is a renowned Wudang swordsman, and his friend Yu Shu Lien, a female warrior, heads a private security company. Shu Lien and Mu Bai have long had feelings for each other, but because Shu Lien had been engaged to Mu Bai's close friend, Meng Sizhao before his death, Shu Lien and Mu Bai feel bound by loyalty to Meng Sizhao and have not revealed their feelings to each other. Mu Bai, choosing to retire, asks Shu Lien to give his fabled 400-year-old sword "Green Destiny" to their benefactor Sir Te in Beijing. Long ago, Mu Bai's teacher was killed by Jade Fox, a woman who sought to learn Wudang secrets. While at Sir Te's place, Shu Lien meets Yu Jiaolong, or Jen, who is the daughter of the rich and powerful Governor Yu and is about to get married.

One evening, a masked thief sneaks into Sir Te's estate and steals the Green Destiny. Sir Te's servant Master Bo and Shu Lien trace the theft to Governor Yu's compound, where Jade Fox had been posing as Jen's governess for many years. Soon after, Mu Bai arrives in Beijing and discusses the theft with Shu Lien. Master Bo makes the acquaintance of Inspector Tsai, a police investigator from the provinces, and his daughter May, who have come to Beijing in pursuit of Fox. Fox challenges the pair and Master Bo to a showdown that night.  Following a protracted battle, the group is on the verge of defeat when Mu Bai arrives and outmaneuvers Fox. She reveals that she killed Mu Bai's teacher because he would sleep with her, but refuse to take a woman as a disciple, and she felt it poetic justice for him to die at a woman's hand. Just as Mu Bai is about to kill her, the masked thief reappears and helps Fox. Fox kills Tsai before fleeing with the thief (who is revealed to be Jen). After seeing Jen fight Mu Bai, Fox realizes Jen had been secretly studying the Wudang manual. Fox is illiterate and could only follow the diagrams, whereas Jen's ability to read the manual allowed her to surpass her teacher in martial arts.

At night, a bandit named Lo breaks into Jen's bedroom and asks her to leave with him. A flashback reveals that in the past, when Governor Yu and his family were traveling in the western deserts, Lo and his bandits raided Jen's caravan and Lo stole her comb. She pursued him to his desert cave to get her comb back. However, the pair soon fell in love. Lo eventually convinced Jen to return to her family, though not before telling her a legend of a man who jumped off a cliff to make his wishes come true. Because the man's heart was pure, he did not die. Lo has come now to Beijing to persuade Jen not to go through with her arranged marriage. However, Jen refuses to leave with him. Later, Lo interrupts Jen's wedding procession, begging her to leave with him. Shu Lien and Mu Bai convince Lo to wait for Jen at Mount Wudang, where he will be safe from Jen's family, who are furious with him. Jen runs away from her husband on their wedding night before the marriage can be consummated. Disguised in male clothing, she is accosted at an inn by a large group of warriors; armed with the Green Destiny and her own superior combat skills, she emerges victorious.

Jen visits Shu Lien, who tells her that Lo is waiting for her at Mount Wudang. After an angry exchange, the two women engage in a duel. Shu Lien is the superior fighter, but Jen wields the Green Destiny and is able to destroy each weapon that Shu Lien wields, until Shu Lien finally manages to defeat Jen with a broken sword. When Shu Lien shows mercy, Jen wounds Shu Lien in the arm. Mu Bai arrives and pursues Jen into a bamboo forest. Mu Bai confronts Jen and offers to take her as his student. She promises to accept him as her teacher if he can take Green Destiny from her in three moves. Mu Bai is able to take the sword in one move, but Jen reneges, and Mu Bai throws the sword over a waterfall. Jen dives after it and is then rescued by Fox. Fox puts Jen into a drugged sleep and places her in a cavern, where Mu Bai and Shu Lien discover her. Fox suddenly appears and attacks the others with poisoned needles. Mu Bai blocks the needles with his sword and mortally wounds Fox, only to realize that one of the needles has hit him in the neck. With her last breath, Fox confesses that her goal had been to kill Jen because Jen had hidden the secrets of Wudang's fighting techniques from her.

Contrite, Jen leaves to prepare an antidote for the poisoned dart. With his last breath, Mu Bai finally confesses his love for Shu Lien. He dies in her arms as Jen returns. Shu Lien forgives Jen, telling her to go to Lo and always be true to herself. The Green Destiny is returned to Sir Te. Jen later goes to Mount Wudang and spends the night with Lo. The next morning, Lo finds Jen standing on a bridge overlooking the edge of the mountain. In an echo of the legend that they spoke about in the desert, she asks him to make a wish. Lo wishes for them to be together again, back in the desert. Jen then glides off the bridge and gently floats down into the mists.

Cast

Credits from British Film Institute:

 Chow Yun-fat as Li Mu Bai (C: 李慕白, P: Lǐ Mùbái)
 Michelle Yeoh as Yu Shu Lien (T: 俞秀蓮, S: 俞秀莲, P: Yú Xiùlián)
 Zhang Ziyi as Jen Yu (T: 玉嬌龍, S: 玉娇龙, P: Yù Jiāolóng)
 Chang Chen as Lo "Dark Cloud" Xiao Hou (T: 羅小虎, S: 罗小虎, P: Luó Xiǎohǔ)
 Lang Sihung as Sir Te (T: 貝勒爺, S: 贝勒爷, P: Bèi-lèyé)
 Cheng Pei-pei as Jade Fox (C: 碧眼狐狸, P: Bìyǎn Húli)
 Li Fazeng as Governor Yu (S: 玉大人, P: Yù Dàrén)
 Wang Deming as Inspector Tsai (S: 蔡九, P: Cài Jiǔ)
 Li Li as Tsai May (S: 蔡香妹, P: Cài Xiāng Mèi)
 Hai Yan as Madam Yu (S: 玉夫人, P: Yù Fūren)
 Gao Xi'an as Bo (S: 劉泰保, P: Liú Tàibǎo)
 Huang Suying as Aunt Wu (S: 吳媽, P: Wú Mā)
 Zhang JinTing as De Lu (S: 德祿, P: Dé Lù)
 Du ZhenXi as Uncle Jiao (S: 焦大爺, P: Jiāo Dà-Yé)
 Li Kai as Gou Jun Pei (S: 魯君佩, P: Lǔ Jūn Pèi)
 Feng Jianhua as Shining Phoenix Mountain Gou (S: 魯君雄, P: Lǔ Jūn Xióng)
 Ma Zhongxuan as Iron Arm Mi (S: 米大鏢, Mǐ-Dà Biāo)
 Li Bao-Cheng as Flying Machete Chang (S: 飛刀常, P: Fēi Dāo Cháng)
 Yang Yongde as Monk Jing (S: 法廣和尚, P: Fǎ Guǎng Héshang)

Themes and interpretations

Title
The title "Crouching Tiger, Hidden Dragon" is a literal translation of the Chinese idiom "臥虎藏龍" which describes a place or situation that is full of unnoticed masters. It is from a poem of the ancient Chinese poet Yu Xin (513–581) that reads "暗石疑藏虎，盤根似臥龍", which means "behind the rock in the dark probably hides a tiger, and the coiling giant root resembles a crouching dragon". The title also has several other layers of meaning. On the most obvious level, the Chinese characters in the title connect to the narrative that the last character in Xiaohu and Jiaolong's names mean "tiger" and "dragon", respectively. On another level, the Chinese idiomatic phrase is an expression referring to the undercurrents of emotion, passion, and secret desire that lie beneath the surface of polite society and civil behavior, which alludes to the film's storyline.

Gender roles 
The success of the Disney animated feature Mulan (1998) popularized the image of the Chinese woman warrior in the west. The storyline of Crouching Tiger, Hidden Dragon is mostly driven by the three female characters. In particular, Jen is driven by her desire to be free from the gender role imposed on her, while Shu Lien, herself oppressed by the gender role, tries to lead Jen back into the role deemed appropriate for her. Some prominent martial arts disciplines are traditionally held to have been originated by women, e.g., Wing Chun. The film's title refers to masters one does not notice, which necessarily includes mostly women, and therefore suggests the advantage of a female bodyguard.

Poison
Poison is also a significant theme in the film. The Chinese word "毒" (dú) means not only physical poison but also cruelty and sinfulness. In the world of martial arts, the use of poison is considered an act of one who is too cowardly and dishonorable to fight; and indeed, the only character who explicitly fits these characteristics is Jade Fox. The poison is a weapon of her bitterness and quest for vengeance: she poisons the master of Wudang, attempts to poison Jen, and succeeds in killing Mu Bai using a poisoned needle. In further play on this theme by the director, Jade Fox, as she dies, refers to the poison from a young child, "the deceit of an eight-year-old girl", referring to what she considers her own spiritual poisoning by her young apprentice Jen. Li Mu Bai himself warns that, without guidance, Jen could become a "poison dragon".

China of the imagination
The story is set during the Qing dynasty (1644–1912), but it does not specify an exact time. Lee sought to present a "China of the imagination" rather than an accurate vision of Chinese history. At the same time, Lee also wanted to make a film that Western audiences would want to see. Thus, the film is shot for a balance between Eastern and Western aesthetics. There are some scenes showing uncommon artistry for the typical martial arts film such as an airborne battle among wispy bamboo plants.

Production
The film was adapted from the novel Crouching Tiger, Hidden Dragon by Wang Dulu, serialized between 1941 and 1942 in Qingdao Xinmin News. The novel is the fourth in a sequence of five. In the contract reached between Columbia Pictures and Ang Lee and Hsu Li-kong, they agreed to invest US$6 million in filming, but the stipulated recovery amount must be more than six times before the two parties will start to pay dividends.

Casting
Shu Qi was Ang Lee's first choice for the role of Jen, but she turned it down.

Filming

Although its Academy Award for Best Foreign Language Film was presented to Taiwan, Crouching Tiger, Hidden Dragon was in fact an international co-production between companies in four regions: the Chinese company China Film Co-production Corporation, the American companies Columbia Pictures Film Production Asia, Sony Pictures Classics, and Good Machine, the Hong Kong company Edko Films, and the Taiwanese Zoom Hunt Productions, as well as the unspecified United China Vision and Asia Union Film & Entertainment, created solely for this film.

The film was made in Beijing, with location shooting in the Anhui, Hebei, Jiangsu, and Xinjiang provinces of China. The first phase of shooting was in the Gobi Desert where it consistently rained. Director Ang Lee noted, "I didn't take one break in eight months, not even for half a day. I was miserable—I just didn't have the extra energy to be happy. Near the end, I could hardly breathe. I thought I was about to have a stroke." The stunt work was mostly performed by the actors themselves and Ang Lee stated in an interview that computers were used "only to remove the safety wires that held the actors" aloft. "Most of the time you can see their faces," he added. "That's really them in the trees."

Another compounding issue was the difference between accents of the four lead actors: Chow Yun-fat is from Hong Kong and speaks Cantonese natively; Michelle Yeoh is from Malaysia and grew up speaking English and Malay, so she learned the Standard Chinese lines phonetically; Chang Chen is from Taiwan and he speaks Standard Chinese in a Taiwanese accent. Only Zhang Ziyi spoke with a native Mandarin accent that Ang Lee wanted. Chow Yun Fat said, on "the first day [of shooting], I had to do 28 takes just because of the language. That's never happened before in my life."

The film specifically targeted Western audiences rather than the domestic audiences who were already used to Wuxia films. As a result, high-quality English subtitles were needed. Ang Lee, who was educated in the West, personally edited the subtitles to ensure they were satisfactory for Western audiences.

Soundtrack

The score was composed by Dun TAN in 1999. It was played for the movie by the Shanghai Symphony Orchestra, the Shanghai National Orchestra and the Shanghai Percussion Ensemble. It features solo passages for cello played by Yo-Yo Ma. The "last track" ("A Love Before Time") features Coco Lee, who later sang it at the Academy Awards. The composer Chen Yuanlin also collaborated in the project. The music for the entire film was produced in two weeks. Tan the next year (2000) adapted his filmscore as a cello concerto called simply "Crouching Tiger."

Release

Marketing
The film was adapted into a video game and a series of comics, and it led to the original novel being adapted into a 34-episode Taiwanese television series. The latter was released in 2004 as New Crouching Tiger, Hidden Dragon for Northern American release.

Home media
The film was released on VHS and DVD on 5 June 2001 by Columbia TriStar Home Entertainment. It was also released on UMD on 26 June 2005. In the United Kingdom, it was watched by  viewers on television in 2004, making it the year's most-watched foreign-language film on television.

Restoration 
The film was re-released in a 4K restoration by Sony Pictures Classics in 2023.

Reception

Box office
The film premiered in cinemas on 8 December 2000, in limited release within the United States. During its opening weekend, the film opened in 15th place, grossing $663,205 in business, showing at 16 locations. On 12 January 2001, Crouching Tiger, Hidden Dragon premiered in cinemas in wide release throughout the U.S., grossing $8,647,295 in business, ranking in sixth place. The film Save the Last Dance came in first place during that weekend, grossing $23,444,930. The film's revenue dropped by almost 30% in its second week of release, earning $6,080,357. For that particular weekend, the film fell to eighth place, screening in 837 theaters. Save the Last Dance remained unchanged in first place, grossing $15,366,047 in box-office revenue. During its final week in release, Crouching Tiger, Hidden Dragon opened in a distant 50th place with $37,233 in revenue. The film went on to top out domestically at $128,078,872 in total ticket sales through a 31-week theatrical run. Internationally, the film took in an additional $85,446,864 in box-office business for a combined worldwide total of $213,525,736. For 2000 as a whole, the film cumulatively ranked at a worldwide box-office performance position of 19.

Critical response

Crouching Tiger, Hidden Dragon was widely acclaimed in the Western world, receiving numerous awards. On Rotten Tomatoes, the film holds an approval rating of 98% based on 168 reviews, with an average rating of 8.6/10. The site's critical consensus states: "The movie that catapulted Ang Lee into the ranks of upper echelon Hollywood filmmakers, Crouching Tiger, Hidden Dragon features a deft mix of amazing martial arts battles, beautiful scenery, and tasteful drama." Metacritic reported the film had an average score of 94 out of 100, based on 32 reviews, indicating "universal acclaim".

Some Chinese-speaking viewers were bothered by the accents of the leading actors. Neither Chow (a native Cantonese speaker) nor Yeoh (who was born and raised in Malaysia) spoke Mandarin Chinese as a mother tongue. All four main actors spoke Standard Chinese with vastly different accents: Chow speaks with a Cantonese accent, Yeoh with a Malaysian accent, Chang Chen with a Taiwanese accent, and Zhang Ziyi with a Beijing accent. Yeoh responded to this complaint in a 28 December 2000, interview with Cinescape. She argued, "My character lived outside of Beijing, and so I didn't have to do the Beijing accent." When the interviewer, Craig Reid, remarked, "My mother-in-law has this strange Sichuan-Mandarin accent that's hard for me to understand," Yeoh responded: "Yes, provinces all have their very own strong accents. When we first started the movie, Cheng Pei Pei was going to have her accent, and Chang Zhen was going to have his accent, and this person would have that accent. And in the end nobody could understand what they were saying. Forget about us, even the crew from Beijing thought this was all weird."

The film led to a boost in popularity of Chinese wuxia films in the western world, where they were previously little known, and led to films such as Hero and House of Flying Daggers, both directed by Zhang Yimou, being marketed towards Western audiences. The film also provided the breakthrough role for Zhang Ziyi's career, who noted:

Film Journal noted that Crouching Tiger, Hidden Dragon "pulled off the rare trifecta of critical acclaim, boffo box-office and gestalt shift", in reference to its ground-breaking success for a subtitled film in the American market.

Accolades
Gathering widespread critical acclaim at the Toronto and New York film festivals, the film also became a favorite when Academy Awards nominations were announced in 2001. The film was screened out of competition at the 2000 Cannes Film Festival. The film received ten Academy Award nominations, which was the highest ever for a non-English language film, up until it was tied by Roma (2018).

The film is ranked at number 497 on Empire's 2008 list of the 500 greatest movies of all time. and at number 66 in the magazine's 100 Best Films of World Cinema, published in 2010.
In 2010, the Independent Film & Television Alliance selected the film as one of the 30 Most Significant Independent Films of the last 30 years.
In 2016, it was voted the 35th-best film of the 21st century as picked by 177 film critics from around the world in a poll conducted by BBC.
The film was included in BBC's 2018 list of The 100 greatest foreign language films ranked by 209 critics from 43 countries around the world. In 2019, The Guardian ranked the film 51st in its 100 best films of the 21st century list.

Sequel
A sequel to the film, Crouching Tiger, Hidden Dragon: Sword of Destiny, was released in 2016. It was directed by Yuen Wo-ping, who was the action choreographer for the first film. It is a co-production between Pegasus Media, China Film Group Corporation, and the Weinstein Company. Unlike the original film, the sequel was filmed in English for international release and dubbed into Chinese for Chinese releases.

Sword of Destiny is based on Iron Knight, Silver Vase, the next (and last) novel in the Crane–Iron Pentalogy. It features a mostly new cast, headed by Donnie Yen. Michelle Yeoh reprised her role from the original. Zhang Ziyi was also approached to appear in Sword of Destiny but refused, stating that she would only appear in a sequel if Ang Lee were directing it.

In the West, the sequel was for the most part not shown in theaters, instead being distributed direct-to-video by the streaming service Netflix.

Posterity 
The theme of Janet Jackson's song "China Love" was related to the film by MTV News, in which Jackson sings of the daughter of an emperor in love with a warrior, unable to sustain relations when forced to marry into royalty.

The names of the pterosaur genus Kryptodrakon and the ceratopsian genus Yinlong (both meaning "hidden dragon" in Greek and Chinese respectively) allude to the film.

The character of Lo, or "Dark Cloud" the desert bandit, influenced the development of the protagonist of the Prince of Persia series of video games.

References

Further reading
 
  – Collection of articles

External links

 
 
 
 
 

2000 films
2000 fantasy films
2000 martial arts films
American martial arts films
Martial arts fantasy films
BAFTA winners (films)
Best Film HKFA
Best Foreign Language Film Academy Award winners
Best Foreign Language Film BAFTA Award winners
Best Foreign Language Film Golden Globe winners
Chinese martial arts films
Films based on Chinese novels
Films directed by Ang Lee
Films scored by Tan Dun
Films set in 18th-century Qing dynasty
Films set in Beijing
Films set in the 1770s
Films that won the Best Original Score Academy Award
Films whose art director won the Best Art Direction Academy Award
Films whose cinematographer won the Best Cinematography Academy Award
Films whose director won the Best Direction BAFTA Award
Films whose director won the Best Director Golden Globe
Films with screenplays by James Schamus
Georges Delerue Award winners
Hong Kong martial arts films
Hugo Award for Best Dramatic Presentation winning works
Independent Spirit Award for Best Film winners
Toronto International Film Festival People's Choice Award winners
Magic realism films
2000s Mandarin-language films
Nebula Award for Best Script-winning works
Sony Pictures Classics films
Taiwanese martial arts films
Wuxia films
2000s American films
2000s Chinese films
2000s Hong Kong films